Lesmone detrahens, the detracted owlet, is an owlet moth in the family Erebidae. The species was first described by Francis Walker in 1858.

The MONA or Hodges number for Lesmone detrahens is 8651.

References

Further reading

External links

 

Omopterini
Articles created by Qbugbot
Moths described in 1858